Margaret (Maggie) Gordon-Smith (married name Maggie Thompson) is a retired British female track cyclist.

Biography
Gordon-Smith is a two times British champion, after winning the 3,000 metres Pursuit Championship at the 1977 British National Track Championships and 1978 British National Track Championships.

Gordon-Smith started cycling with the Evesham & District Wheelers Cycling Club in 1968 before moving to Beacon RCC. She had competed in her maiden name of Gordon-Smith until marrying Andrew Thompson in 1976 and then competed in her married name. The pair had a business making bike frames. She retired in 1978.

References

Living people
British female cyclists
British track cyclists
Year of birth missing (living people)